The Gozo Channel Company Limited, commonly known as Gozo Channel Line or the Gozo ferry, is a Maltese company founded in 1979 that operates ferry services between the islands of Malta and Gozo using Roll-on/roll-off (RORO) ferries. Crossings happen throughout the day all-year round including weekends, public holidays, and night services.

The company's ferry services are the main connection between the two islands and it is used by millions of Gozitans, Maltese and tourists every year. It currently operates three identical ferries, all of which were built between March 2000 and March 2002. In addition to the normal services of foot passengers and car passengers, Gozo Channel also offers services for cargo vehicles and hazardous cargo.

Predecessors
A ferry service connecting the islands of Malta and Gozo has existed for centuries, with records indicating that dgħajjes tal-latini were used as ferries as early as 1241 from the harbour of Mġarr. Dgħajjes tal-latini, also known as Gozo boats, remained in use until after the Second World War. A few survive to this day, such as the Maryanne operated by Captain Morgan Cruises, although this does not have any masts.

Despite this, the first regular passenger service between the islands was only inaugurated on 13 June 1885, when O.F. Gollcher & Sons Ltd provided an official mail service using the vessel Gleneagles. By the end of the 19th century G.P. Sammut & Co and Francesco Pace were also offering ferry services. These three companies had stopped operating services by 1923, when the Malta Steamship Co Ltd took over with two vessels. In the late 1920s and 1930s Bernard Zammit and the Joseph Gasan, Giovanni Dacoutros & Grech Family started their own ferry services. More companies were formed after the war, including Joseph Gasan (1947-57), the Magro Family (1948-70), the Magro & Zammit Families (1958-68) and the Malta Aliscafi Ltd (1964-68). At some points there was only one company operating services in the Gozo Channel while at other times there were more at the same time.

E. Zammit & Sons Ltd was formed in 1966, and by 1970 it was the only company offering ferry services across the Gozo Channel. It operated four vessels until Gozo Channel Company Limited was formed in 1979.

The following ships were used as ferries from Malta to Gozo between 1885 and 1978:

History

Gozo Channel Company Limited was formed to operate ferry services in 1979. The four ships of E. Zammit & Sons Ltd were taken over by the new company, and two more vessels were purchased later in the year. The MV Għawdex began operating services to Sicily from 1981 onwards, but these stopped in 1995.

Hovermarines or catamarans were used for express services between Malta and Gozo from 1988 to 2002. By 1990 the company was carrying 1.93 million passengers and 370,000 cars annually. By the mid-1990s a modernization program started and three brand new ships were built from 2000 to 2002. Mġarr ferry terminal was later completely rebuilt from 2001 to 2008. The terminal at Ċirkewwa was also rebuilt in the next few years and was completed in 2013.

Gallery

References

Notes

Gozo
Ferry companies of Malta
Transport companies established in 1979
1979 establishments in Malta
Gozo Channel